Wahyu Nayaka Arya Pankaryanira (born 22 June 1992) is an Indonesian badminton player who plays in doubles category. Born in East Lombok, Pankaryanira has joined the Ratih club in Banten.

Achievements

Southeast Asian Games 
Men's doubles

BWF World Tour (1 title, 2 runners-up) 
The BWF World Tour, which was announced on 19 March 2017 and implemented in 2018, is a series of elite badminton tournaments sanctioned by the Badminton World Federation (BWF). The BWF World Tour is divided into levels of World Tour Finals, Super 1000, Super 750, Super 500, Super 300, and the BWF Tour Super 100.

Men's doubles

BWF Grand Prix (5 titles) 
The BWF Grand Prix had two levels, the BWF Grand Prix and Grand Prix Gold. It was a series of badminton tournaments sanctioned by the Badminton World Federation (BWF) which was held from 2007 to 2017.

Men's doubles

  BWF Grand Prix Gold tournament
  BWF Grand Prix tournament

BWF International Challenge/Series (2 titles) 
Men's doubles

  BWF International Challenge tournament
  BWF International Series tournament

Invitational tournament 
Men's doubles

Performance timeline

National team 
 Senior level

Individual competitions 
 Senior level

Record against selected opponents 
Men's doubles results against World Superseries finalists, World Superseries Finals semifinalists, World Championships semifinalists, and Olympic quarterfinalists paired with:

Ade Yusuf Santoso

  Chai Biao & Hong Wei 1–1
  Liu Cheng & Zhang Nan 0–1
  Lee Jhe-huei & Lee Yang 1–0
  Lee Sheng-mu & Tsai Chia-hsin 1–0
  Mads Pieler Kolding & Mads Conrad-Petersen 2–0
  Mathias Boe & Carsten Mogensen 0–3
  Angga Pratama & Rian Agung Saputro 0–1
  Marcus Fernaldi Gideon & Kevin Sanjaya Sukamuljo 1–1
  Markis Kido & Marcus Fernaldi Gideon 0–2
  Muhammad Ahsan & Hendra Setiawan 0–1
  Hirokatsu Hashimoto & Noriyasu Hirata 0–1
  Kenichi Hayakawa & Hiroyuki Endo 0–3
  Takeshi Kamura & Keigo Sonoda 0–1
  Takuto Inoue & Yuki Kaneko 0–1
  Ko Sung-hyun & Lee Yong-dae 0–2
  Ko Sung-hyun & Shin Baek-cheol 1–1
  Ko Sung-hyun & Yoo Yeon-seong 0–1
  Lee Yong-dae & Yoo Yeon-seong 0–3
  Koo Kien Keat & Tan Boon Heong '1–0
  Goh V Shem & Lim Khim Wah 0–1
  Goh V Shem & Tan Wee Kiong 0–1
  Hoon Thien How & Tan Wee Kiong 0–1
  Vladimir Ivanov & Ivan Sozonov '''2–1

References

External links 
 

1992 births
Living people
Sportspeople from West Nusa Tenggara
Indonesian male badminton players
Competitors at the 2019 Southeast Asian Games
Southeast Asian Games gold medalists for Indonesia
Southeast Asian Games bronze medalists for Indonesia
Southeast Asian Games medalists in badminton
21st-century Indonesian people
20th-century Indonesian people